Kamiura Dam is an earthfill dam located in Ehime Prefecture in Japan. The dam is used for irrigation. The catchment area of the dam is 0.5 km2. The dam impounds about 2  ha of land when full and can store 155 thousand cubic meters of water. The construction of the dam was started on 1973 and completed in 1978.

References

Dams in Ehime Prefecture
1978 establishments in Japan